Bjarni Már Magnússon (born 6 September 1979) is an Icelandic lawyer who his currently a Professor at Law at Reykjavík University.

Personal life
Bjarni is married to Hildur Sigurðardóttir, a former member of the Icelandic national basketball team. He played for Þór Akureyri in the Icelandic top-tier Úrvalsdeild karla. During the 2000–2001 season, he averaged 14.8 points for Íþróttafélag Stúdenta in the second-tier 1. deild karla.

References

External links
Bio at Reykjavík University

1979 births
Living people
University of Iceland alumni
University of Miami alumni
Bjarni Mar Magnusson
Bjarni Mar Magnusson